Lorient  is a quartier of Saint Barthélemy in the Caribbean. It is located in the northern part of the island. 

Its parish church Église de Lorient is dedicated to Our Lady of the Assumption; its parish cemetery contains the grave of Johnny Hallyday.

References

External links 

Populated places in Saint Barthélemy
Quartiers of Saint Barthélemy